

The ACS-100 Sora is a Brazilian two-seat Light Sport Aircraft, designed by Advanced Composites Solutions.

Development
The Sora (originally designated the ACS-100 Triathlon) was developed from the CB-10 Triathlon project designed by the Brazilian aircraft designer Cláudio Barros of the Federal University of Minas Gerais.  The Sora is a two-seat side-by-side all-composite low-wing cantilever monoplane with a conventional tail unit.  It has a fixed tricycle landing gear with retractable gear as an option.  It is designed to be fully aerobatic (+6g to −4g).  The first flight was planned for May 2008 with delivery of the first aircraft planned for the first half of 2008.

Specifications (ACS-100)

References

Aircraft manufactured in Brazil
2000s Brazilian sport aircraft
Aircraft first flown in 2008
Light-sport aircraft
Low-wing aircraft
Single-engined tractor aircraft